Roscow George Shedden (13 May 1882 – 11 December 1956) was an Anglican colonial bishop in the first half of the 20th century.

Born into the family of Sir George Shedden of Paulespury Park, at East Cowes he was educated at Twyford School, Winchester, and Brasenose College, Oxford, and was ordained into the ministry of the Church of England in 1907. His first posts were at St Peter's Leicester and All Saints, Margaret Street. He was ordained to the episcopate as  Bishop of Nassau, a position he held until 1931. Returning to England he was Vicar of St Peter and St Paul's, Wantage from 1931 until his retirement in 1952. He was also an Assistant Bishop of Oxford from 1947 until his death on 11 December 1956.

References

1882 births
People from Cowes
People educated at Twyford School
People educated at Winchester College
Alumni of New College, Oxford
20th-century Anglican bishops in the Caribbean
Anglican bishops of Nassau
1956 deaths